KXLI (94.5 MHz Exa FM) is a commercial FM radio station serving the Moapa Valley, St. George, Utah and Las Vegas areas, but focused on Las Vegas as a rimshot station. Licensed to Moapa, Nevada, it is owned by Activo Broadcasting LLC. The studios and offices are on South Eastern Avenue in Las Vegas.

KXLI has an effective radiated power (ERP) of 93,000 watts.  Its transmitter is near the Arizona border south of Bunkerville.  The station also operates a co-channel booster, KXLI-FM1 in Sunrise Manor, Nevada, a suburb of Las Vegas.

History
94.5 signed on as KMOA under the branding "Rehab Radio" on May 2, 2008. Rehab Radio was a stunt format that aired while the station was testing the transmitter, playing Dance music. The call letters changed to KVBE on May 6, 2008 and the identity as "94.5 The Vibe" was born on May 8, 2008. The launch was co-consulted by Dance radio veterans Trevor Simpson from the now defunct KNGY “Energy 92.7” in San Francisco, California, Joel Salkowitz from the now defunct WNYZ-LP “Pulse 87.7” in New York City, New York, and Mark "Tic Tak" Allen of KUPL/98.7 FM in Portland, Oregon. The Vibe was programmed by industry veteran Rob Walker as a Dance Hits format, with imaging done by Mitch Craig. In November 2009, KVBE's signal repeater added crucial coverage within the Las Vegas area, since the primary coverage area does not clearly reach the city of Las Vegas in most places.

In March 2010, the station's operations were taken over by D2 Media, LLC and began reimaging itself on air (with Mitch Craig being phased out, replaced by St. John), launched a new website (with vibevegas.com being phased out, replaced by 945thevibe.com), and a new logo was unveiled. More mixshows and some of the world's top talent would be featured including: John Digweed, Carl Cox, Roger Sanchez, Manufactured Superstars, Eddie Halliwell, Markus Schulz, Armin Van Buuren, Jordan Stevens, Paul Oakenfold, DJ Vegas Vibe, DJ Maze, Matt Darey, Dave Onex, and Beaux Tech.

As of July 2010, while still claiming itself as a Dance station, KVBE's playlist format was refocused to a Rhythmic Top 40 which played Dance remixes of Top 40 tracks with barely any Dance tracks in rotation, but over time The Vibe began incorporating more Dance Hits into the format. The new format was under guidance by Michael Oaks (Mike O.), owner of Energy 98 and 2004 - 2005 program director of now defunct KNRJ ("Energy 92.7 & 101.1") in Phoenix, Arizona and Mark "Tic Tak" Allen of KUPL/98.7 in Portland, Oregon. The station imaging by St. John was phased out, and Rich Van Slyke became the new voice of The Vibe until mid-April 2011 when Emma Clarke, the same person who voiced Pulse 87 in New York City, became the new voice of The Vibe.

On July 1, 2011, Jelli took over KVBE and KHIJ under an LMA, under which the two stations (renamed KXLI and KYLI) would broadcast interactive CHR and rock formats respectively. Listeners would be able to control the stations' content by upvoting and downvoting songs in real-time with the company's mobile app.  That format lasted only a year.

The station was placed on sale on eBay during January 2012.  The "Buy It Now" price for the station was $8,950,000, but when the auction closed on January 29, 2012, the winning bid was $305,100, a fraction of the asking price. The owner of Aurora Media, Scott Mahalick, acquired the station for $22 million, but due to the economic crisis, estimated the station's current worth at $10 million. Mahalick claims that this was the first time a radio station was sold on eBay; however, at least one other station, a 6,000-watt AM station in Texas, was put for auction in 2009. Also, in 2007, another broadcasting property, television station WMKG-CA in Muskegon, Michigan, was auctioned on eBay.

On July 1, 2012, as a result of the sale, KXLI changed their format to Spanish Top 40 CHR using the Exa FM format from MVS Radio of Mexico, branded as "94.5 Exa FM". Aurora Media sold the station to Radio Activo Broadcasting on August 2, 2012, at a purchase price of $3 million.

On October 16, 2020, KXLI flipped from Mexico's "Exa FM" to Spanish AC branded as "Exito 94.5". On January 9, 2022, KXLI switched again from Spanish-language AC branded as "Éxito 94.5" to Mexico's "Exa FM".

References

External links

XLI
KXLI
Radio stations established in 2006
Spanish-language radio stations in the United States
Mainstream adult contemporary radio stations in the United States